Mokaberi (also Romanized as Mokāberī and Makāberi; also known as Mukābari) is a village in Dashti-ye Esmail Khani Rural District, Ab Pakhsh District, Dashtestan County, Bushehr Province, Iran. At the 2006 census, its population was 146, in 29 families.

References 

Populated places in Dashtestan County